Suyamariyadhai is a 1992 Tamil-language action drama film, directed by R. Vijayganesh, starring Karthik and Pallavi. It was released on 24 July 1992.

Plot

Vijay (Karthik) is an honest police officer who tries to capture the criminal Muthukarrupan. Muthukarrupan now turned hotel manager and is known under the name of JK. The criminal's partner is Jayaraj (Senthamarai), a corrupt police officer. Vijay and Rekha (Pallavi) fall in love with each other. In the meantime, he becomes friend with Raj (Rajthilak).

In the past, Vijay's sister Durga (K. R. Vijaya), an unmarried famous singer, brought her siblings, Bhavani and Vijay. Jayaraj, humiliated by Durga one day, revenged her by sending her to jail. Bhavani's marriage was cancelled and Bhavani then committed suicide.

Vijay later realizes that Rekha is Jayaraj's daughter. Jayaraj even agrees to marry his daughter to Vijay but he doesn't recognize Vijay. Therefore, Vijay hides Durga's identity. One day, Jayaraj found his daughter in a brothel because of Vijay's conspiracy.

Raj turns out to be an undercover spy who worked with Vijay. So Vijay and Raj planned to kill the heartless Muthukarrupan.

Cast

Karthik as Vijay
Pallavi as Rekha
Rajthilak as Raj
V. K. R. Raghunath as Muthukarrupan (JK)
K. R. Vijaya as Durga, Vijay's sister
Senthamarai as Jayaraj
V. K. Ramasamy as a policeman
S. S. Chandran as Arjuna, a policeman
K. K. Soundar as Ponnambalam
Raja Bhadar
Oru Viral Krishna Rao
Kokko Muthu
Jayalalita as Shakeela
Devibala
C. K. Saraswathi
Thalapathy Dinesh
Nethran

Soundtrack

The film score and the soundtrack were composed by Sivaji Raja. The soundtrack, released in 1992, features 4 tracks with lyrics written by Senguttuvan and Vaali.

Reception
The Indian Express wrote "The film has nothing to offer to the audience except the song sequences".

References

1992 films
1990s Tamil-language films
Fictional portrayals of the Tamil Nadu Police